Lamoria imbella is a species of snout moth. It is found in Kenya, Madagascar, Malawi, Nigeria, South Africa and Zimbabwe.

References

Moths described in 1864
Tirathabini
Moths of Africa
Moths of Madagascar